Gabriel Arturo Torres Tejada (born 31 October 1988) is a Panamanian professional footballer who plays for Deportes Antofagasta and the Panama national team.

Career

Club
He was widely regarded as the top prospect from Panama and in 2007 he traveled twice to England to train with Manchester United and once in Spain with Valencia. On his second flight to Manchester he got injured on the second day of practice and had to return home, where he played for ANAPROF side Chepo. In 2008, he was loaned for 6 months to 2007 Mustang Cup runner-up La Equidad, his loan contract was later extended for 6 extra months. In his debut in Colombia, Torres scored in a 2–3 loss against Deportivo Pereira. In January 2009 Torres signed a loan contract for a year with current Mustang Cup champions América Cali. However, after missing the pre-season because of his participation in the 2009 UNCAF Nations Cup with Panama, he was relegated to the bench where he would spend most of his matches. On 30 March he was released from America after having returned to his home late and intoxicated, allegations Torres has denied. Gaby returned to Panama to play with Chepo in April 2009.

In January 2010 Torres moved abroad again to play for Colombian side Atlético Huila alongside compatriot Amílcar Henríquez and in July 2011 moved to Venezuelan side Zamora and he became the club's all-time top goalscorer in February 2013 after scoring his 29th goal against Portuguesa.

On 8 August 2013, Torres signed with the Colorado Rapids of Major League Soccer. He is the Rapids' first Designated Player.

International
Torres made his debut for Panama in an October 2005 FIFA World Cup qualification match against Trinidad and Tobago. He was also captain of the Panama U-20 squad that took part in the 2007 FIFA World Youth Cup in Canada.

In May 2018, Torres was named in Panama's 23-man squad for the 2018 FIFA World Cup in Russia.

Career statistics

International

International goals
Scores and results list Panama's goal tally first.

Honours

Chepo
Copa Rommel Fernández: 2003

La Equidad
Copa Colombia: 2008

Zamora
Venezuelan Primera División:  2013–14, 2016

Independiente Del Valle 
Copa Sudamericana (1): 2019''

Individual
Chosen revelation player of ANAPROF in 2005
Top scorer of Copa Rommel Fernández with 18 goals: 2003
Top scorer of Primera A with 17 goals: 2004, 2005
Top scorer of ANAPROF with 9 goals: 2007 (A)
Top scorer of Venezuelan Primera División with 20 goals: 2012–13
Top scorer of 2013 CONCACAF Gold Cup with 5 goals

References

Bienvenida formal a Gabriel Torres, de su nuevo club FC LAUSANNE-SPORT‚ tvn-2.com, 24 June 2016

External links

1988 births
Living people
Sportspeople from Panama City
Association football forwards
Panamanian footballers
Panamanian expatriate footballers
Panama international footballers
Panama youth international footballers
Panama under-20 international footballers
Chepo FC players
San Francisco F.C. players
La Equidad footballers
América de Cali footballers
Atlético Huila footballers
Zamora FC players
Colorado Rapids players
Colorado Rapids 2 players
FC Lausanne-Sport players
C.D. Huachipato footballers
Universidad de Chile footballers
C.S.D. Independiente del Valle footballers
Club Universidad Nacional footballers
L.D. Alajuelense footballers
C.D. Antofagasta footballers
Designated Players (MLS)
Liga Panameña de Fútbol players
Categoría Primera A players
Major League Soccer players
USL Championship players
Venezuelan Primera División players
Swiss Super League players
Chilean Primera División players
Ecuadorian Serie A players
Liga MX players
Liga FPD players
2007 UNCAF Nations Cup players
2009 UNCAF Nations Cup players
2011 Copa Centroamericana players
2011 CONCACAF Gold Cup players
2013 CONCACAF Gold Cup players
2014 Copa Centroamericana players
2015 CONCACAF Gold Cup players
Copa América Centenario players
2017 CONCACAF Gold Cup players
Copa Centroamericana-winning players
2018 FIFA World Cup players
2019 CONCACAF Gold Cup players
2021 CONCACAF Gold Cup players
Expatriate footballers in Colombia
Expatriate footballers in Venezuela
Expatriate soccer players in the United States
Expatriate footballers in Switzerland
Expatriate footballers in Chile
Expatriate footballers in Ecuador
Expatriate footballers in Mexico
Panamanian expatriate sportspeople in Colombia
Panamanian expatriate sportspeople in Venezuela
Panamanian expatriate sportspeople in the United States
Panamanian expatriate sportspeople in Switzerland
Panamanian expatriate sportspeople in Chile
Panamanian expatriate sportspeople in Ecuador
Panamanian expatriate sportspeople in Mexico
FIFA Century Club